Bruce Parkhill (born June 16, 1949) is a former head college men's basketball coach whose stops included William & Mary (1977–1983) and Penn State (1983–1995).

His 1990–91 Nittany Lions won the Atlantic 10 Conference Tournament and stunned UCLA, 74–69, in the opening round of the NCAA Tournament at the Syracuse Carrier Dome

Parkhill's efforts assembled a team that's generally regarded as one of the best in the history of the program, though he resigned Sept. 6, 1995 just before what proved to be a memorable season. The 1995–96 Nittany Lions, led by Jerry Dunn and assistants Ed DeChellis (now head coach at Navy) and Frank Haith (now head coach at Tulsa), started 13–0 (ranked as high as No. 9 in AP poll), moved from Rec Hall to the Bryce Jordan Center, finished tied for second in the Big Ten, the school's highest placing ever, but were upset as a 5-seed in the NCAA first round by Arkansas.

Parkhill guided Penn State to four straight 20-win seasons before starting play in the Big Ten in 1992–93. All 43 seniors who played for him at Penn State did graduate.

His father, Will, lettered for the Nittany Lion basketball team in 1948. A 1967 State College Area High School graduate, Parkhill lettered in three sports at Lock Haven University before graduating in 1971. His younger brother, Barry Parkhill, was a basketball standout at the University of Virginia.

Later in his career, Parkhill served as an assistant coach at Ohio State University and earlier as a head coach for the William & Mary Tribe.

His tenure at William & Mary was fairly successful. Bruce guided the Indians (W&M's official mascot at the time) to an 89–75 (54.3%) overall record between 1977–1983. On December 7, 1977 William & Mary upset second-ranked North Carolina 78–75, in Williamsburg. The 1982–83 season saw W&M go 9–0 in conference play to win the ECAC South regular season championship. .

Head coaching record

References

1949 births
Living people
Basketball coaches from Pennsylvania
Basketball players from Philadelphia
College men's soccer players in the United States
College men's track and field athletes in the United States
Lock Haven Bald Eagles men's basketball players
Ohio State Buckeyes men's basketball coaches
Penn State Nittany Lions basketball coaches
Soccer players from Philadelphia
University of Virginia alumni
William & Mary Tribe men's basketball coaches
American soccer players
Association footballers not categorized by position
American men's basketball players
Track and field athletes from Philadelphia
Sportspeople from Philadelphia